

Karl-Albrecht von Groddeck (18 February 1894 – 10 January 1944) was a German general in the Wehrmacht during World War II who commanded several divisions. He was a recipient of the Knight's Cross of the Iron Cross of Nazi Germany.  He died from wounds on 10 January 1944 in a Breslau hospital and was posthumously promoted to Generalleutnant.

Awards and decorations

 Knight's Cross of the Iron Cross on 8 September 1941 as Oberst and commander of Infanterie-Regiment 120 (mot.)

References

Citations

Bibliography

 

1894 births
1944 deaths
Military personnel from Berlin
People from the Province of Brandenburg
Lieutenant generals of the German Army (Wehrmacht)
German Army personnel of World War I
Prussian Army personnel
Recipients of the Knight's Cross of the Iron Cross
Recipients of the clasp to the Iron Cross, 1st class
German Army personnel killed in World War II
German Army generals of World War II